Barin in Iran may refer to:
 Barin, Golestan
 Barin, Zanjan

See also
 Barin (disambiguation)